Courtney Hawkins is the name of:

 Courtney Hawkins (hurdler) (born 1967), American hurdler
 Courtney Hawkins (American football) (born 1969), American football player (Wide Receiver)
 Courtney Hawkins (baseball) (born 1993), baseball player